Gladsheim Peak is a prominent  mountain summit located in the Valhalla Ranges of the Selkirk Mountains in British Columbia, Canada. Gladsheim is the highest point in the Valhalla Ranges. The name "Valhalla Mountains" first appeared in George Mercer Dawson's Geological Survey of Canada map published in 1890. Dawson applied names derived from Scandinavian mythology to several of the mountain ranges and peaks in Southern Kootenay. Gladsheim is the magnificent meeting hall containing thirteen council seats where, according to Norse mythology, Odin presided over all the realms. In keeping with the Valhalla theme, this peak's name was submitted in 1900 by R. W. Brock to the Geological Survey of Canada for consideration, and it was officially adopted March 31, 1924, by the Geographical Names Board of Canada. 

Based on the Köppen climate classification, Gladsheim Peak has a subarctic climate with cold, snowy winters, and mild summers. Temperatures can drop below −20 °C with wind chill factors  below −30 °C. Precipitation runoff from the mountain drains into Gwillim Creek and Mulvey Creek, both tributaries of the Slocan River. Its nearest higher peak is Mount Cooper,  to the northeast.

Climbing Routes
Established climbing routes on Gladsheim Peak:

 West Ridge - 
 West Face -  
 South Face, The White Dihedral -  
 Southwest Face -  
 North Ridge Bypass - 
 Trireme Wall - class 5.6

See also
 
Geography of British Columbia

References

Gallery

External links
 Weather forecast: Gladsheim Peak
 Flickr aerial photo: Gladsheim's north aspect
 Valhalla Range photo Gladsheim on left

Two-thousanders of British Columbia
Selkirk Mountains
Kootenay Land District